The Sudan National Under-17 Football Team, represents Sudan in international football at an under-17 level and is controlled by the Sudan Football Association. The team's first appearance on the world stage was in 1991 at the 1991 FIFA U-17 World Championship in Italy.

Competitive record

FIFA U-16 and U-17 World Cup record

Africa U-17 Cup of Nations record

CAF U-16 and U-17 World Cup Qualifiers record 

*Draws include knockout matches decided on penalty kicks.

See also
Sudan national football team
Sudan national under-23 football team
Sudan national under-20 football team

References

External links
 
Sudan at FIFA.com.
Sudan at CAF Online.
Team profile - soccerway.com

African national under-17 association football teams
Under-17